Dominique Williams (born December 11, 1992) is a former American football wide receiver. He played college football at Washington State. He is 6th all-time in Pac–12 for receiving touchdowns.

Early life and education
Dom Williams was born on December 11, 1992.

He played college football at Washington State Cougars.

2011
As a freshman in 2011, Williams did not play and redshirted.

2012
In 2012 he played in 11 games. He had two 100-yard games that year. He made 34 receptions for 546 yards and three touchdowns.

2013
In 2013 he appeared in all 13 games, making 40 catches for 647 yards and 7 touchdowns. His seven touchdowns were seventh in the Pac-12. He had two 100-yard games.

2014
In 2014, he played in all 12 games, recording 43 catches for 656 yards and 9 touchdowns. He was 5th in Pac-12 for touchdown catches. He led the team with seven 25+ yard catches. For the third straight year, he had two 100-yard games.

2015
In 2015, he played 13 games, and produced 75 catches for 1040 yards and 11 touchdowns. He was third in touchdowns for Pac-12. He was 5th for receptions. He had three 100-yard games. He is sixth all-time for Pac-12 touchdowns with 30.

College statistics

Professional career

Los Angeles Chargers
In 2016, Williams was signed by the Los Angeles Chargers. In preseason against the Arizona Cardinals, he led the team with 4 catches for 55 yards. He was released at roster cuts.

Philadelphia Eagles
On January 11, 2017, he signed with the Philadelphia Eagles. He was placed on injured reserve on May 15. He was injured all season. While he was on injured reserve, the Philadelphia Eagles beat the New England Patriots in Super Bowl LII. He was released in May 2018.

Detroit Lions
On August 3, 2018, Williams was signed by the Detroit Lions. He did not make the final roster.

Post-football career

On July 1, 2022, Williams graduated from the New York City Police Academy.

References

External links
 Washington State Cougars bio

1992 births
Living people
American football wide receivers
Washington State Cougars football players
Players of American football from California
Sportspeople from Pomona, California